The Draconian Rage is a Big Finish Productions audio drama featuring Lisa Bowerman as Bernice Summerfield, a character from the spin-off media based on the long-running British science fiction television series Doctor Who. The story is a sequel to the Doctor Who audio adventure The Dark Flame.

Plot 
Bernice has been invited to the heart of the Draconian Empire to investigate why twenty million of their race have committed suicide as part of an ancient ritual. Soon, she discovers that the event is related to something that happened in her past.

Cast
Bernice Summerfield — Lisa Bowerman
Irving Braxiatel — Miles Richardson
Emperor Shenn — Philip Bretherton
Lord Vasar — Johnson Willis
Lord Paranesh — Kraig Thornber

External links
Big Finish Productions - Professor Bernice Summerfield: The Draconian Rage

Bernice Summerfield audio plays
Fiction set in the 27th century